Trans-spanning ligands are bidentate ligands that can span opposite sites of a complex with square-planar geometry. A wide variety of ligands that chelate in the cis fashion already exist, but very few can link opposite vertices on a coordination polyhedron. Early attempts to generate trans-spanning bidentate ligands relied on long hydrocarbon chains to link the donor functionalities, but such ligands often lead to coordination polymers.

History
A diphosphane linked with pentamethylene was claimed to span across a square planar complex. This early attempt was followed by ligands with more rigid backbones. "TRANSPHOS" was the first trans-spanning diphosphane ligand that usually coordinates to palladium(II) and platinum(II) in a trans manner. TRANSPHOS features benzo[c]phenanthrene substituted by diphenylphosphinomethyl (Ph2PCH2) groups at the 1 and 11 positions. The polycyclic framework suffers sterically clashing hydrogen centers.

Xantphos, SPANphos, TRANSDIP and related ligands
Xantphos is a trans-spanning ligand, without the steric problems associated with TRANSPHOS. SPANphos is comparable to XANTPHOS but more reliably trans-spanning.  TRANSDIP, based on a α-cyclodextrin, is the first ligand to give exclusively trans-spanned complexes, even with d8 metal ion halides.

References

Coordination chemistry